The 2016 Pendle Borough Council election took place on 5 May 2016 to elect members of Pendle Borough Council in England. This was on the same day as other local elections.

By-elections between 2016 and 2018

References

2016 English local elections
2016
2010s in Lancashire